Saint-Augustin is a station on Line 9 of the Paris Métro. Named after Place Saint-Augustin (itself named after Saint-Augustin church, the station opened on 27 May 1923 with the line's extension from Trocadéro. It is located in the 8th arrondissement.

History
After the extension of Line 14 to Saint-Lazare opened in 2004, the station was connected to Saint-Lazare Métro station (which is near Saint-Lazare railway station) by a long underground passageway. This allows interchange to Line 14 as advertised on RATP maps. There is also connection to Lines 3, 12 and 13 via the Line 14 platforms, but under normal operating conditions these connections are not useful and are not indicated on RATP maps.

Nearby
The current Saint-Augustin church, built in 1868 by Baltard, replaced an old chapel which was also dedicated to St Augustine (354–430).

Station layout

References
Roland, Gérard (2003). Stations de métro. D'Abbesses à Wagram. Éditions Bonneton.

Paris Métro stations in the 8th arrondissement of Paris
Railway stations in France opened in 1923